The European Labour Authority (ELA) is an agency of the European Union tasked with coordinating and supporting the enforcement of EU law on labour mobility. Its activities started on 17 October 2019 and the agency is expected to reach a yearly budget of €50 million and 140 staff by 2024. Bratislava, Slovakia is the agency's host city.

Function 

The agency does not exert any regulatory authority directly, but rather works to coordinate the enforcement efforts of other national European agencies for instance cooperation between inspection officers from different member states. Among the agency's tasks are resolution of disputes arising under its authority, coordination of labour inspections, and information sharing among member states.

History 

The agency was first suggested by Jean-Claude Junker, President of the European Commission, during his 2017 State of the European Union address. On 13 February 2018, the European Commission presented its first draft of the regulation establishing the authority. On 14 February 2019, the Parliament and Council reached a provisional agreement on the proposal. On 13 June 2019, the Commission announced that Bratislava, Slovakia would serve as the agency's host city.

The agency moved to its official seat from Brussels to Bratislava on 1 September 2021 and signed the Headquarters agreement with Slovakia on 16 October 2021. The inauguration of the premises took place 9 November 2021 in the presence of Commissioner Nikolas Schmit, Prime Minister Eduard Heger, Minister of Labour of Slovakia, and hosted by Ambassador Cosmin Boiangiu, the Executive Director of ELA.

References 

Labour
European Union
Authority